Kapalkundala is a Bengali television soap opera based on the novel of the same name written by Bankim Chandra Chatterjee. It premiered on 2 December 2019 and will air on Bengali GEC Star Jalsha, 9:30 pm every day. It is produced by Raj Chakraborty and stars Soumi Chatterjee, Debojyoti Roychowdhury, Saunak Ray, Tumpa Paul & Sayak Chakraborty

Cast
 Srija Bhattacharjee / Soume Chatterjee as Kapalkundala Sharma
 Saptarshi Sen Roy Chowdhury / Sounak Ray as Nabakumar Sharma
 Brishti Chatterjee / Idhika Paul as Padmabati
 Debojyoti Roychowdhury as Kaapalik
 Chaitali Chakraborty as Kanak, Nabakumar's aunt.
 Sayak Chakraborty as Ganesh (Nabakumar's brother)
Shreya Chatterjee as Pushpa

References 

Bengali-language television programming in India
Indian drama television series
2019 Indian television series debuts
2020 Indian television series endings
Star Jalsha original programming